8:46 is a virtual reality indie video game based on the September 11 attacks.
The video game takes place in the World Trade Center and during the plane crash into the North Tower. The game is called 8:46 because it is the exact time that American Airlines Flight 11 crashed into the North Tower.

References

2015 video games
Simulation video games
Windows games
Windows-only games
Works about the September 11 attacks
Video games developed in the United States
Video games about terrorism
Video games set in New York City
Video games set in 2001
Virtual reality games